The Jay Van Hook Potato Cellar is a historic potato house located in Jerome, Idaho.

Description and history
The Van Hook potato cellar was built in 1922 using local lava rock. Each of these wall has an  double door large enough and configured to allow wagons or trucks to drive through the building. Flush jams and  lintels of rough concrete surround the doors, the lintels faced with wooden planks. Small four paned ventilation windows near ground level are on either side of the doors on both ends. The main facade door has a smaller door cut into it. The interior is supported by a pole framework covered with wire, straw and dirt. The wide joints of the masonry are filled to the face of the stone making the stones appear submerged in mortar. It was listed on the National Register of Historic Places on September 8, 1983, as part of a group of structures built from lava rock in south central Idaho.

See also
 History of agriculture in the United States
 National Register of Historic Places listings in Jerome County, Idaho

References

External links 
 * 

1922 establishments in Idaho
Agricultural buildings and structures on the National Register of Historic Places in Idaho
Buildings and structures in Jerome County, Idaho
Commercial buildings completed in 1922
National Register of Historic Places in Jerome County, Idaho